Tolpia fyani is a moth of the family Erebidae first described by Michael Fibiger in 2007. It is known from north-eastern Vietnam.

The wingspan is about 13 mm. The hindwing is brown and the underside unicolorous brown.

References

Micronoctuini
Taxa named by Michael Fibiger
Moths described in 2007